The Spartanburg Spinners were a minor league baseball team located in Spartanburg, South Carolina.  The team played in the 1983 South Atlantic League.  Their home stadium was Duncan Park.

References

Defunct South Atlantic League teams
Professional baseball teams in South Carolina
Defunct baseball teams in South Carolina
Baseball teams disestablished in 1983
Baseball teams established in 1983